Goring and Streatley are twin villages in the English counties of Oxfordshire and Berkshire respectively, separated by the River Thames and joined by a bridge. The villages are administratively separate entitles but are sometimes treated as one village for the purpose of naming shared buildings. 

For the villages, see:

 Goring-on-Thames
 Streatley

For jointly named entities, see:

 Goring and Streatley Bridge
 Goring and Streatley Golf Club
 Goring and Streatley railway station